The 2011–12 National League B season was played from September 9, 2011, to February 7, 2012. The regular season was won by Lausanne HC with 105 points, 15 points ahead of the second place team, SC Langenthal. The playoffs were played from February 12 to March 27, 2012, with SC Langenthal defeating Lausanee HC to become Swiss Champions of NLB.
Langenthal would later play HC Ambrì-Piotta in the league qualification series. Since Ambrì-Piotta would defeat Langenthal in the series, there was no changes to the NLA or NLB teams for the 2012–2013 seasons.

Regular season

The National League B regular season consists of 45 games, 2 double rounds playing each team twice, and a single round playing each team once.

Standings

Attendance

League Leaders

Scoring

Playoffs

During the first round of the playoffs, National League regulations state that the top seeded team my play any team of its choice from the bottom 4 seeds. The next seeded team may then choose their opponent from the remaining 3 of the bottom 4 seeds and so on. The same rule applies for the Semi-Finals. During the playoffs, teams alternate venues game to game, with the highest seed playing home first.

Tournament Bracket

League Qualification

The champions of the National League B has the opportunity to play the losing team of a Play-Out tournament from the National League A to take their spot in the league. SC Langenthal took on HC Ambrì-Piotta in a 7-game series, losing 4-1 and remaining in the National League B.

HC Ambrì-Piotta vs. SC Langenthal

External links
  National League B, official website
  National League B, official website

National League B seasons
2
Swiss